Ramon Costa may refer to:

 Ramon Costa (footballer, 1987–2018), Brazilian football striker
 Ramón Costa (footballer, born 1992), Brazilian football forward